Patricia Colleen Nelligan (born March 16, 1950), known professionally as Kate Nelligan, is a Canadian stage, film and television actress. She was nominated for the Academy Award for Best Supporting Actress for the 1991 film The Prince of Tides, and the same year won the BAFTA Award for Best Actress in a Supporting Role for Frankie and Johnny. She is also a four-time Tony Award nominee for her work on Broadway, receiving nominations for Plenty (1983), A Moon for the Misbegotten (1984), Serious Money (1988) and Spoils of War (1989).

Early life
Nelligan, the fourth of six children, was born in London, Ontario, the daughter of Patrick Joseph Nelligan and his wife Josephine Alice (née Deir). Her father was a factory repairman and municipal employee in charge of ice rinks and recreational parks, and her mother was a schoolteacher.

Her mother, whom Nelligan has described as "very powerful, very brilliant and very, very crazy", suffered from alcohol abuse and other psychological problems, and was subsequently institutionalized. Nelligan attended London South Collegiate Institute in London, Ontario, then studied at Glendon College in Toronto, but did not graduate. Instead, she switched to studies at the Central School of Speech and Drama in London, England.

Career
In August 1972, Nelligan launched her professional stage career as a "funny and convincing" Corie in the Bristol Old Vic production of Barefoot in the Park by Neil Simon. In the Bristol Old Vic studio space in the following April she took the role of Leila in  The Screens, an abridgement by Howard Brenton of Jean Genet's savage Les Paravents. On television, she appeared in a regular role in the British television series The Onedin Line. In 1974, she was invited to London to play the part of Jenny in David Hare's play Knuckle at the Comedy Theatre, followed by a season with the National Theatre playing Ellie in Heartbreak House. 1975 saw her appear opposite Anthony Hopkins in the televised play The Arcata Promise followed by the televised theatrical version of The Count of Monte Cristo that featured an all-star cast of British and American actors. That same year her first feature-length film The Romantic Englishwoman was released.

In 1977, again with the National Theatre, Nelligan gave a "stunning" performance as Marianne, opposite Stephen Rea, in Horváth's Tales from the Vienna Woods directed by Maximilian Schell. Also in 1977, she played the part of Rosalind in As You Like It, directed by Terry Hands, opposite Peter McEnery in Stratford-upon-Avon and the following year in London. This she followed with Plenty, another play from David Hare, at the National Theatre, for which she received the 1978 "Best Actress" Evening Standard Theatre Award, with a runner-up position as "Best Actress in a New Play" in that season's Oliviers. She was cast in a similar role, playing opposite Bill Paterson, in Hare's BAFTA-award-winning companion play Licking Hitler, for BBC television.

Again on screen, in 1978 Nelligan played the part of Isabella in the BBC Television Shakespeare production of Measure for Measure, a performance that led the New York Times to describe her as providing "the image of idealized faultlessness". In 1979, she was the female lead alongside Frank Langella and Laurence Olivier in Dracula. In 1981, she starred opposite fellow Canadian Donald Sutherland in Eye of the Needle, a wartime espionage thriller based on the Ken Follett best-selling novel. Two years later Nelligan moved to New York City, where she earned nominations for the Tony Award as Best Actress in a Play three times and one Featured Actress in a Play between 1983 and 1989 for the five Broadway plays in which she appeared.

In 1991, Nelligan won a BAFTA for "Best Actress in a Supporting Role" for her performance in Frankie and Johnny. For her performance in the 1991 film The Prince of Tides she was nominated for the Academy Award for Best Supporting Actress. Between 1987 and 2004, she was nominated for five Gemini Awards for her performances in Canadian television mini-series and films and won twice, both in 1993. In 1996, she played the wife of James Mink in the CBS television film Captive Heart: The James Mink Story.

Personal life
Nelligan and American composer Robert Reale married in 1989. Together they have a son. The couple divorced in 2000.

Filmography

Film

Television

Broadway plays
Plenty (1983)
A Moon for the Misbegotten (1984)
Serious Money (1988)
Spoils of War by Michael Weller, Music Box Theatre New York (1988)
Love Letters (1989)
An American Daughter (1997)

Awards and nominations

References

External links

1950 births
Canadian film actresses
Canadian stage actresses
Canadian television actresses
Best Supporting Actress BAFTA Award winners
Best Supporting Actress Genie and Canadian Screen Award winners
Actresses from London, Ontario
Alumni of the Royal Central School of Speech and Drama
Living people
Canadian expatriates in England
Glendon College alumni